Middletown Village is an unincorporated community located in the central part of Middletown Township, Monmouth County, New Jersey. It was the first settlement in the township and one of the oldest in New Jersey. The Middletown Village Historic District, encompassing the community, was listed on the state and national registers of historic places in 1974.

History
The first land purchase was a deed dated in 1664 and settlement of the area started soon afterwards. The Kings Highway was established in 1719. On June 29, 1778, British forces used the road to withdraw after the Battle of Monmouth.

Historic district

The Middletown Village Historic District is a  historic district located on both sides of Kings Highway, south and west of NJ 35. The district was added to the National Register of Historic Places on May 3, 1974, for its significance in education, military history, political history, religion, and settlement. It includes 15 contributing resources, including Christ Church.

Religion
There are three historic churches along Kings Highway. The Old First Church, founded in 1688, is the oldest Baptist congregation in New Jersey. Christ Church, founded in 1702, is one of the oldest Episcopal parishes in New Jersey. The Middletown Reformed Church dates from 1836.

Gallery

See also
 National Register of Historic Places listings in Monmouth County, New Jersey

References

External links
 
 
 
 

Middletown Township, New Jersey
Unincorporated communities in Monmouth County, New Jersey
Unincorporated communities in New Jersey
National Register of Historic Places in Monmouth County, New Jersey
Historic districts on the National Register of Historic Places in New Jersey
New Jersey Register of Historic Places